Lipovci is a village in the Municipality of Beltinci in the Prekmurje region of northeastern Slovenia.

There is a small Neo-Gothic chapel in the settlement. It was built in the early 20th century and is dedicated to Saints Peter and Paul. It has a belfry above the entrance and two smaller turrets on either corner. It belongs to the Parish of Beltinci.

References

External links
Lipovci on Geopedia

Populated places in the Municipality of Beltinci